The Bjo Awards (formerly The Independent Star Trek Fan Film Awards) is a set of annual awards to recognize achievement in excellence among independent Star Trek fan films released to the Internet during the previous calendar year.  Inspired by the Hugo and Nebula Awards and based loosely on the Emmy, Oscar and Tony Awards, the Bjo Awards are presented at the annual Treklanta convention in Atlanta, Georgia.  Created and produced by Treklanta founder and chairman Eric L. Watts, the Bjo Awards is a juried competition judged by a panel of industry professionals with established credits in the Star Trek franchise and/or notable Star Trek fans with professional experience in the entertainment industry.

Bjo Trimble—who coordinated the letter-writing campaigns that successfully saved the original Star Trek series from cancellation at the end of its second season and petitioned President Gerald R. Ford to rename NASA's first space orbiter "USS Enterprise" and who also wrote The Star Trek Concordance—and her husband John were guests of honor at the 2016 Treklanta and presenters of awards at that year's Independent Star Trek Fan Film Awards ceremony.  At the end of the ceremony, Mrs. Trimble told Watts how impressed she was with the awards program, thanked all those who were involved in their creation, production and presentation, and graciously agreed, at Watts' request, to lend her name to them.  The announcement of this name change was made at the 2017 awards ceremony and fully implemented by the time of the 2018 ceremony.

The actual award is an 8 x 10 wall plaque on a cherry wood board with a color back plate and sublimated inscription plate.  Each plaque includes the award category; series name, episode title and name(s) of the winners; and date of the award inscribed on the inscription plate.

Eligibility requirements 

To be eligible for consideration in each year's awards, an independent Star Trek fan film must:
 Be a live-action dramatic presentation set in the Star Trek universe, not animated or CGI, nor a satire or parody of Star Trek
 Have "Based upon Star Trek, Created by Gene Roddenberry" (or similar) in the title sequence, opening credits or closing credits 
 Have been released to the Internet (YouTube, Vimeo, etc.) during the previous calendar year, and
 Have an entry on IMDb.com with full cast and crew credits listed 
Although not explicitly stated as a requirement, only films in English or with English subtitles have been included in these awards due to the practical matter of judges not speaking the language of foreign-language films which otherwise meet all four eligibility requirements.

2015 

Sixteen independent Star Trek fan films released in calendar year 2014 with a total running time of eight hours, five minutes were deemed eligible for consideration for the 2015 Independent Star Trek Fan Film Awards.

Based loosely on the Emmy, Oscar and Tony awards, the original nine categories were Best Production Design; Best Visual Effects; Best Soundtrack; Best Original Story or Screenplay; Best Supporting Actor or Actress; Best Actor or Actress; Best Director; Best Dramatic Presentation, Short Form (30 minutes or less); and Best Dramatic Presentation, Long Form (31 minutes or longer).

The panel of judges for the 2015 awards included Diana Dru Botsford, Peter David, Keith R. A. DeCandido, Michael DeMeritt and Susan Sackett.  The awards ceremony was held at Treklanta on April 26, 2015, hosted by Eric L. Watts and Brian Holloway.  Awards presenters included Jason Carter, Keith R. A. DeCandido, Sean Kenney and Anne Lockhart.

Films eligible for consideration

Winners & finalists by category

Summary 
Star Trek: Axanar won six of nine awards (Best Production Design; Best Visual Effects; Best Soundtrack; Best Original Story or Screenplay; Best Director and Best Dramatic Presentation, Short Form), Star Trek Continues won two awards (Best Actor or Actress and Best Dramatic Presentation, Long Form) and Star Trek New Voyages: Phase II won one award (Best Supporting Actor or Actress).

2016 
Eighteen independent Star Trek fan films released in calendar year 2015 with a total running time of six hours, fifty minutes were deemed eligible for consideration for the 2016 Independent Star Trek Fan Film Awards.

For 2016, the category of Best Visual Effects was broadened to include Special Effects and renamed Best Special & Visual Effects, and Best Actor or Actress was renamed Best Lead Actor or Actress.  Additionally, the Best Soundtrack category was split into Best Original Music and Best Sound Design, Editing & Mixing; and categories for Best Guest Actor or Actress, Best Costuming and Best Makeup & Hairstyling were added, increasing the total number of categories from nine to thirteen.

The panel of judges for the 2016 awards included Diana Dru Botsford, Keith R. A. DeCandido, Ken Feinberg, Matthew M. Foster, Andrew Greenberg, David Orange, Emmett Plant and Rick Sternbach.  The awards ceremony was held at Treklanta on April 17, 2016, hosted by Eric L. Watts and Brian Holloway.  Awards presenters included Tracee Lee Cocco, Jack Stauffer, Carel Struycken and John & Bjo Trimble.

Films eligible for consideration

Winners & finalists by category

Summary 
Star Trek: Renegades won seven of thirteen awards (Best Production Design; Best Special & Visual Effects; Best Sound Design, Editing & Mixing; Best Makeup & Hairstyling; Best Costuming; Best Director and Best Original Story or Screenplay), Star Trek Continues won five awards (Best Original Music; Best Guest Actor or Actress; Best Supporting Actor or Actress; Best Lead Actor or Actress and Best Dramatic Presentation, Long Form) and Starship Tristan won one award (Best Dramatic Presentation, Short Form).

2017 
Thirty-three independent Star Trek fan films released in calendar year 2016 with a total running time of eleven hours, forty-nine minutes were deemed eligible for consideration for the 2017 Independent Star Trek Fan Film Awards.

For 2017, the category of Best Production Design was deleted, decreasing the total number of categories from thirteen to twelve.

The panel of judges for the 2017 awards included Diana Dru Botsford, Keith R. A. DeCandido, John DeSentis, Matthew M. Foster, Andrew Greenberg, Robert Greenberger, Cheralyn Lambeth and Archie H. Waugh.  The awards ceremony was held at Treklanta on April 30, 2017, hosted by Eric L. Watts and Brian Holloway.  Awards presenters included David Gerrold, James Horan, Gary Graham and John G. Hertzler.

Films eligible for consideration

Winners & finalists by category

Summary 
Star Trek Continues won six of twelve awards (Best Sound Design, Editing & Mixing; Best Makeup & Hairstyling; Best Costuming; Best Guest Actor or Actress; Best Supporting Actor or Actress and Best Director), Star Trek: Horizon won four awards (Best Special & Visual Effects; Best Original Music; Best Original Story or Screenplay and Best Dramatic Presentation, Long Form) and Needs of the Many won two awards (Best Lead Actor or Actress and Best Dramatic Presentation, Short Form).

2018 
Twenty-one independent Star Trek fan films released in calendar year 2017 with a total running time of eight hours, fifteen minutes were deemed eligible for consideration for the 2018 Bjo Awards.

For 2018, no changes were made to the previous year's twelve award categories.

The panel of judges for the 2018 awards included Rigel Ailur, Diana Dru Botsford, Dr. Meldrena Chapin, Keith R. A. DeCandido, Andrew Greenberg and Geoffrey Thorne.  The awards ceremony was held at Treklanta on May 27, 2018, hosted by Eric L. Watts and Brian Holloway.  Awards presenters included Conrad Coates, Gary Graham and Robert O'Reilly.

Films eligible for consideration

Winners & finalists by category

Summary 
Star Trek Continues won ten of twelve awards (Best Special & Visual Effects; Best Sound Design, Editing & Mixing; Best Makeup & Hairstyling; Best Costuming; Best Guest Actor or Actress; Best Supporting Actor or Actress; Best Lead Actor or Actress; Best Director; Best Original Story or Screenplay and Best Dramatic Presentation, Long Form), The Federation Files won one award (Best Original Music) and The Derelict won one award (Best Dramatic Presentation, Short Form).

2019 
Twenty-six independent Star Trek fan films released in calendar year 2018 with a total running time of six hours, thirty-nine minutes were deemed eligible for consideration for the 2019 Bjo Awards.

For 2019, because only two of the twenty-six eligible films had running times longer than thirty minutes, the categories of Best Dramatic Presentation, Short Form (30 minutes or less) and Best Dramatic Presentation, Long Form (31 minutes or longer) were combined into a single category, Best Dramatic Presentation, decreasing the total number of categories from twelve to eleven.

The panel of judges for the 2019 awards included Rigel Ailur, Diana Dru Botsford, Andrew Greenberg, Jason P. Hunt, William Schlichter and Andrew Wallace.  The awards ceremony was held at Treklanta on May 26, 2019, hosted by Eric L. Watts and Marc B. Lee.  Awards presenters included Aron Eisenberg, Bill Blair and Nichole McAuley.

Films eligible for consideration

Winners & finalists by category

Summary 
Avalon Universe, "Ghost Ship" won four of eleven awards (Best Special & Visual Effects, Best Makeup & Hairstyling, Best Supporting Actor or Actress, Best Dramatic Presentation); The Adventures of the USS Parkview, "The Bunny Incident" won two awards (Best Original Music, Best Original Story or Screenplay); The Fall of Starbase One won two awards (Best Lead Actor or Actress, Best Director) and shared one with Good Men (Best Costuming); Last Survivor won one award (Best Sound Design, Editing & Mixing); and Starship Endeavour, "The Monolith, Part One" and "The Monolith, Part Two" won one award (Best Guest Actor or Actress).

2020 
Thirty-three independent Star Trek fan films released in calendar year 2019 with a total running time of ten hours, nine minutes were deemed eligible for consideration for the 2020 Bjo Awards.  Eleven of these films were one-half of a two-part film.  Because the casts and crews of these eleven films are identical in both parts, the ballot listed them as single two-part films in order to not pad the ballot with double entries for essentially the same film.  (One film, the 16-minute first half of a two-parter, was withdrawn from the ballot because the second part was not released until 2020, reducing the total run time of the remaining films to nine hours, fifty-four minutes.  This excluded film will be included on the 2021 ballot.)  As a result, the remaining ten films, each one half of an episode, became five two-parters, with two of them exceeding 30 minutes in running time.  There were also five single-part films that exceeded 30 minutes, bringing the total number of films, as listed on the ballot, that exceeded 30 minutes to seven.  Accordingly, the category of Best Dramatic Presentation was once again divided into two categories: Best Dramatic Presentation, Short Form (30 minutes or less) and Best Dramatic Presentation, Long Form (31 minutes or longer), bringing the total number of award categories back up to twelve.  The remaining ten unchanged categories were Best Original Story or Screenplay; Best Director; Best Lead Actor or Actress; Best Supporting Actor or Actress; Best Guest Actor or Actress; Best Costuming; Best Makeup & Hairstyling; Best Original Music; Best Sound Design, Editing & Mixing; and Best Special & Visual Effects.

The panel of judges for the 2020 awards included Rigel Ailur, Troy Bernier, Michael A. Burstein, Melissa Carter, Matthew M. Foster, Andrew Greenberg, Robert Greenberger, Mark McCray, Jeremy Roberts, William Schlichter and Andrew Wallace.  The awards ceremony was held at Neutral Zone Studios in Kingsland, Georgia, on December 11, 2021, hosted by Eric L. Watts and Pixi "Ilia" Nereid.  The awards presenter was Pixi "Ilia" Nereid.

Films eligible for consideration

Winners & finalists by category

Summary 
Line of Duty won seven of twelve awards (Best Special & Visual Effects; Best Makeup & Hairstyling; Best Costuming; Best Supporting Actor or Actress; Best Lead Actor or Actress; Best Director; Best Dramatic Presentation, Short Form); Avalon Universe, "Demons" Part 1 and Part 2 won three awards (Best Sound Design, Editing & Mixing; Best Original Music; Best Guest Actor or Actress); and The Holy Core won two awards (Best Original Story or Screenplay; Best Dramatic Presentation, Long Form).

References

Notes

IMDb listings 

Star Trek fandom
American film awards
Awards established in 2015
Fan films based on Star Trek